"Gotta Get Back to You" is a song written by Tommy James and Bob King and recorded by Tommy James and the Shondells for their 1970 album, Travelin'. The song reached #45 on The Billboard Hot 100 in 1970. The song also reached #16 in Canada.

References

1970 singles
Songs written by Tommy James
Tommy James and the Shondells songs
1970 songs
Roulette Records singles